Ritual of Love is the second album by the American singer Karyn White, released on September 10, 1991. It contains her biggest hit, "Romantic", as well as her R&B hit, "The Way I Feel About You".

Track listing

Production
Produced by Christopher Troy & Zachary Harmon, Jimmy Jam & Terry Lewis, Michael J. Powell, Laney Stewart & Karyn White
Executive producers: Jimmy Jam, Benny Medina, Karyn White
Engineers: Mike Girgis, Steve Hodge, Michael Iacopelli, Terry Lewis, Al Richardson, David Rideau, Eric Sproul, Laney Stewart, David Ward II
Assistant engineer: Milton Chan
Mixing: Milton Chan, Steve Hodge, Barney Perkins, Michael J. Powell

Personnel
Drums, percussion: Trenon Graham, Michael J. Powell, Stokley, David Ward II
Drum programming: Laney Stewart, Stokley
Bass: Edgar "Boney E." Hinton, Terry Lewis
Synthesized bass: Bruce Sterling, Christopher Troy
Keyboards, synthesizers: Lance Alexander (also sampling), Vernon D. Fails, Gary Hines, Jimmy Jam, Keri Lewis, Bruce Sterling, Laney Stewart, Christopher Troy, Lawrence Waddell, David Ward II
Guitars: Richard Davis, Michael J. Powell
Saxophone: Ken Holmen
Backing vocals: Lance Alexander, Jearlyn Steele Battle, Joey Elias, Lisa Keith, Prof. T., Andre Shepard, Darron Story

Charts

Weekly charts

Year-end charts

Certifications

References

1991 albums
Warner Records albums
Karyn White albums
Albums produced by Laney Stewart
Albums produced by Jimmy Jam and Terry Lewis
Albums produced by Michael J. Powell